= Kallarati =

Newspaper in Albania

- Language: Albanian

Kallarati is a newspaper published in Albania.
